Flegomene was the pen name of an 18th-century Italian physicist.

His real name is unknown. He wrote Sopra gli effetti del moto nella fabbrica del mondo ("On the effects of motion in the factory of the world") in the form of an epistolary, published in 1769 in Genoa.

Works

References

Bibliography 

18th-century births
18th-century deaths
18th-century Italian physicists
Scientists from Genoa